The 2002 RCA Championships was a men's tennis tournament played on outdoor hard courts at the Indianapolis Tennis Center in Indianapolis, Indiana in the United States and was part of the International Series Gold of the 2002 ATP Tour. It was the 15th edition of the tournament and ran from August 12 through August 18, 2002.

Finals

Singles

 Greg Rusedski defeated  Félix Mantilla 6–7(6–8), 6–4, 6–4
 It was Rusedski's 2nd title of the year and the 15th of his career.

Doubles

 Mark Knowles /  Daniel Nestor defeated  Mahesh Bhupathi /  Max Mirnyi 7–6(7–4), 6–7(5–7), 6–4
 It was Knowles' 6th title of the year and the 23rd of his career. It was Nestor's 5th title of the year and the 25th of his career.